Dusmal House is a historic building in Gastonville, Pennsylvania. It is a three-bay, -story house built in 1839. A one-story addition was added later in the nineteenth century.  The historic significance of the house is as an example of the Post Colonial style of architecture found in Western Pennsylvania.  Vernacular builders mixed elements of Georgian, Roman Classical, Adamesque, and  European Renaissance styles as they saw fit, differing from traditions in other parts of the country.

In addition to its National Register of Historic Places listing, it is also designated as a historic residential landmark/farmstead by the Washington County History & Landmarks Foundation.

References

Houses on the National Register of Historic Places in Pennsylvania
Houses completed in 1839
Houses in Washington County, Pennsylvania
National Register of Historic Places in Washington County, Pennsylvania